Ichthyology is the branch of zoology devoted to the study of fish, including bony fish (Osteichthyes), cartilaginous fish (Chondrichthyes), and jawless fish (Agnatha). According to FishBase, 33,400 species of fish had been described as of October 2016, with approximately 250 new species described each year.

Etymology
The word is derived from the Greek words ἰχθύς, ikhthus, meaning "fish"; and λογία, logia, meaning "to study".

History

The study of fish dates from the Upper Paleolithic Revolution (with the advent of "high culture"). The science of ichthyology was developed in several interconnecting epochs, each with various significant advancements.

The study of fish receives its origins from humans' desire to feed, clothe, and equip themselves with useful implements. According to Michael Barton, a prominent ichthyologist and professor at Centre College, "the earliest ichthyologists were hunters and gatherers who had learned how to obtain the most useful fish, where to obtain them in abundance, and at what times they might be the most available". Early cultures manifested these insights in abstract and identifiable artistic expressions.

1500 BC–40 AD
Informal, scientific descriptions of fish are represented within the Judeo-Christian tradition. The Old Testament laws of kashrut forbade the consumption of fish without scales or appendages. Theologians and ichthyologists believe that the apostle Peter and his contemporaries harvested the fish that are today sold in modern industry along the Sea of Galilee, presently known as Lake Kinneret. These fish include cyprinids of the genera Barbus and Mirogrex, cichlids of the genus Sarotherodon, and Mugil cephalus of the family Mugilidae.

335 BC–80 AD 

Aristotle incorporated ichthyology into formal scientific study. Between 333 and 322 BC, he provided the earliest taxonomic classification of fish, accurately describing 117 species of Mediterranean fish. Furthermore, Aristotle documented anatomical and behavioral differences between fish and marine mammals. After his death, some of his pupils continued his ichthyological research. Theophrastus, for example, composed a treatise on amphibious fish. The Romans, although less devoted to science, wrote extensively about fish. Pliny the Elder, a notable Roman naturalist, compiled the ichthyological works of indigenous Greeks, including verifiable and ambiguous peculiarities such as the sawfish and mermaid, respectively. Pliny's documentation was the last significant contribution to ichthyology until the European Renaissance.

European Renaissance 

The writings of three 16th-century scholars, Hippolito Salviani, Pierre Belon, and Guillaume Rondelet, signify the conception of modern ichthyology. The investigations of these individuals were based upon actual research in comparison to ancient recitations. This property popularized and emphasized these discoveries. Despite their prominence, Rondelet's De Piscibus Marinis is regarded as the most influential, identifying 244 species of fish.

16th–17th century 

The incremental alterations in navigation and shipbuilding throughout the Renaissance marked the commencement of a new epoch in ichthyology. The Renaissance culminated with the era of exploration and colonization, and upon the cosmopolitan interest in navigation came the specialization in naturalism. Georg Marcgrave of Saxony composed the Naturalis Brasilae in 1648. This document contained a description of 100 species of fish indigenous to the Brazilian coastline. In 1686, John Ray and Francis Willughby collaboratively published Historia Piscium, a scientific manuscript containing 420 species of fish, 178 of these newly discovered. The fish contained within this informative literature were arranged in a provisional system of classification.

The classification used within the Historia Piscium was further developed by Carl Linnaeus, the "father of modern taxonomy". His taxonomic approach became the systematic approach to the study of organisms, including fish. Linnaeus was a professor at the University of Uppsala and an eminent botanist; however, one of his colleagues, Peter Artedi, earned the title "father of ichthyology" through his indispensable advancements. Artedi contributed to Linnaeus's refinement of the principles of taxonomy. Furthermore, he recognized five additional orders of fish: Malacopterygii, Acanthopterygii, Branchiostegi, Chondropterygii, and Plagiuri. Artedi developed standard methods for making counts and measurements of anatomical features that are modernly exploited. Another associate of Linnaeus, Albertus Seba, was a prosperous pharmacist from Amsterdam. Seba assembled a cabinet, or collection, of fish. He invited Artedi to use this assortment of fish; unfortunately, in 1735, Artedi fell into an Amsterdam canal and drowned at the age of 30.

Linnaeus posthumously published Artedi's manuscripts as Ichthyologia, sive Opera Omnia de Piscibus (1738). His refinement of taxonomy culminated in the development of the binomial nomenclature, which is in use by contemporary ichthyologists. Furthermore, he revised the orders introduced by Artedi, placing significance on pelvic fins. Fish lacking this appendage were placed within the order Apodes; fish having abdominal, thoracic, or jugular pelvic fins were termed Abdominales, Thoracici, and Jugulares, respectively. However, these alterations were not grounded within evolutionary theory. Therefore, over a century was needed for Charles Darwin to provide the intellectual foundation needed to perceive that the degree of similarity in taxonomic features was a consequence of phylogenetic relationships.

Modern era 

Close to the dawn of the 19th century, Marcus Elieser Bloch of Berlin and Georges Cuvier of Paris made attempts to consolidate the knowledge of ichthyology. Cuvier summarized all of the available information in his monumental Histoire Naturelle des Poissons. This manuscript was published between 1828 and 1849 in a 22-volume series. This document describes 4,514 species of fish, 2,311 of these new to science. It remains one of the most ambitious treatises of the modern world. Scientific exploration of the Americas advanced knowledge of the remarkable diversity of fish. Charles Alexandre Lesueur was a student of Cuvier. He made a cabinet of fish dwelling within the Great Lakes and Saint Lawrence River regions.

Adventurous individuals such as John James Audubon and Constantine Samuel Rafinesque figure in the faunal documentation of North America. They often traveled with one another. Rafinesque wrote Ichthyologic Ohiensis in 1820. In addition, Louis Agassiz of Switzerland established his reputation through the study of freshwater fish and the first comprehensive treatment of palaeoichthyology, Poisson Fossil's. In the 1840s, Agassiz moved to the United States, where he taught at Harvard University until his death in 1873.

Albert Günther published his Catalogue of the Fish of the British Museum between 1859 and 1870, describing over 6,800 species and mentioning another 1,700. Generally considered one of the most influential ichthyologists, David Starr Jordan wrote 650 articles and books on the subject and served as president of Indiana University and Stanford University.

Modern publications

Organizations

Notable ichthyologists 

Members of this list meet one or more of the following criteria: 1) Author of 50 or more fish taxon names, 2) Author of major reference work in ichthyology, 3) Founder of major journal or museum, 4) Person most notable for other reasons who has also worked in ichthyology.

 Alexander Emanuel Agassiz
 Louis Agassiz
 HIM Emperor Akihito of Japan
 Gerald R. Allen
 Peter Artedi
 Herbert R. Axelrod
 William O. Ayres, California
 Spencer Fullerton Baird
 Tarleton Hoffman Bean
 Lev Berg, Russia
 Henry Bryant Bigelow
 Pieter Bleeker, East Indies
 Marcus Elieser Bloch
 George Albert Boulenger
 Jean Cadenat
 Pierre Carbonnier
 Eugenie Clark
 Leonard Compagno
 Edward Drinker Cope
 Georges Cuvier
 Francis Day, India
 Francis Buchanan-Hamilton, Scottish
 Carl H. Eigenmann
 Rosa Smith Eigenmann
 William N. Eschmeyer
 Barton Warren Evermann
 Henry Weed Fowler
 Joseph Paul Gaimard
 Samuel Garman
 Charles Henry Gilbert
 Theodore Nicholas Gill
 Charles Frédéric Girard
 George Brown Goode

 Albert Günther
 Albert William Herre
 Carl L. Hubbs
 David Starr Jordan
 Maurice Kottelat, Swiss
 Bernard Germain de Lacépède
 Carl Linnaeus
 Seth Eugene Meek
 George S. Myers
 Joseph S. Nelson, Fishes of the World
 John Treadwell Nichols, China, founder of Copeia
 John Roxborough Norman
 Peter Simon Pallas
 Wilhelm Peters
 Felipe Poey
 Jean René Constant Quoy
 Constantine Samuel Rafinesque
 John Ernest Randall
 Charles Tate Regan
 John Richardson
 Eduard Rüppell
 Johann Gottlob Schneider
 H.M. Smith
 J.L.B. Smith
 Edwin Chapin Starks
 Franz Steindachner
 Royal D. Suttkus 
 Shigeho Tanaka
 Ethelwynn Trewavas, English
 Achille Valenciennes
 Johann Julius Walbaum
 Gilbert Percy Whitley
 Francis Willughby
 Stan Wood
 William Yarrell

Paleoichthyologists
 Hans C. Bjerring
 Erik Jarvik
 Erik Stensiö

See also 
 Ichthyology terms
 Ichthyology and GIS
 Meristics

References

Additional references

 Bond, Carl E (1996) Biology of Fish. Saunders. .
 Nelson, Joseph S (2006) Fish of the World. Wiley. .
 Michael Barton (2007) Bond's Biology of Fish, Third Edition. Julet. .
 Pauly D, Froese R, Palomares ML and Stergiou KI (2014) Fish on line, Version 3 A guide to learning and teaching ichthyology using the FishBase Information System.

External links

 Brian Coad's Dictionary of Ichthyology
 Ichthyology Web Resources
 List of Ichthyologists 

 
Subfields of zoology